The Piedmont Region Headquarters (Grattacielo della Regione Piemonte) is a skyscraper in Turin, Italy, which houses the administrative offices of the Piedmont Region. The building, designed by Massimiliano Fuksas, was topped out in 2015.

Construction started in Autumn 2011, followed by a series of missteps delaying the completion of the project. In October 2012, after a year of work on the site, an investigation was started on the assignment of the call for tenders for construction. At the end of March 2016, a new investigation was launched, delaying the final stages of construction. The windows installed on the building were faulty, and roughly 300 of the 3,600 already-installed windows needed to be replaced. 
Work did not resume until the summer of 2017. 
As of June 2020, the tower has been topped out, but construction at the site continues and the anticipated move-in date for employees in September 2021 has been pushed out to December 2022.

See also
 List of tallest buildings in Italy

References

Other projects

Palaces in Turin
Skyscrapers in Turin
Skyscraper office buildings in Italy
Massimiliano Fuksas buildings